Liptovská Kokava is a village and municipality in Liptovský Mikuláš District in the Žilina Region of northern Slovakia, at the foot of Kriváň, Slovakia's symbolic and often considered most beautiful mountain.

History
In historical records the village was first mentioned in 1469, at the foot of Kriváň, Slovakia's symbolic and often considered most beautiful mountain.

The surname 'Kokavec' is believed to originate from this village.

Geography
It has a population of about 1,054 people.

References

External links
Obec Liptovská Kokava - Oficiálna stránka obce Liptovská Kokava

Villages and municipalities in Liptovský Mikuláš District